ECMA or Ecma may refer to:

 Ecma International (formerly European Computer Manufacturers Association), a standards organization for information communication technology and consumer electronics
 Engineering College Magazines Associated, a group of student-run engineering-based publications in the US
 East Coast Music Association, that hosts the East Coast Music Awards, an annual awards ceremony in Canada

See also
 EMCA (disambiguation)
 ECMAScript, a scripting language standardized by Ecma International whose best-known dialect is JavaScript
 List of Ecma standards